Hai Koi Hum Jaisa is a compilation album by Strings that was released in 2003.

Track listing
All songs are written by Anwar Maqsood, those which are not are mentioned below.
All songs are composed by Bilal Maqsood and Faisal Zafar.

External links
Strings Online - Official Website

2003 compilation albums
Strings (band) albums